Güney Erkurt (born 1 December 1983), better known by his stage name Saian, is a Turkish rapper and songwriter. He is also big brother of the rapper Patron.

Discography

Albums and EPs 
 "Kült" 2005	 
 "Olma!" 2006	 
 "Opus Magnum Provaları" 2006	 
 "Bootleg Kofti Bootleg" 2006	 
 "Sıkı Dur Geliyorum" 2007	 
 "Battle Royal (ft. Karaçalı)" 2009	 
 "Dilimizi Biliyor" 2010	 
 "Başıbozuk" 2012	 
 "Başıbozuk 2" 2013	 
 "Hal ve Gidiş Sıfır (ft. Köst)" 2017	 
 "Malenkof! (ft. Köst)" 2017	 
 "Berhava" 2019	 
 "Deliler Bayramı (ft. Köst)" 2020

Singles 
 Ay Şarkısı (2020)
 Birkaç Güzel Gün İçin (feat. Bedo) (2020)
 S.O.S (feat. Patron) (2020)
 Kırmızı Çiçeklinin Öyküsü (2018)
 Kalsedon (2018)
 Tüm Ölü Krallar (feat. Sinem Güngör) (2018)

References 

Living people
1983 births
Turkish rappers
Turkish hip hop
Turkish lyricists
Turkish male singers
People from Mersin